NML Cygni or V1489 Cygni (abbreviated to NML Cyg or V1489 Cyg) is a red hypergiant or red supergiant (RSG) in the constellation Cygnus. It is one of the largest stars currently known by radius, and is also one of the most luminous and massive cool hypergiants, as well as one of the most luminous stars in the Milky Way.

The radius of NML Cyg is uncertain but calculated to be between 1,183 and 2,770 times that of the Sun. If placed at the center of the Solar System, its surface would extend past the orbit of Jupiter or Saturn.

Observational history

The name NML comes from the names of these three discoverers. The second star was briefly referred to as NML Tauri but is now known as IK Tauri, an M9 Mira variable. NML Cygni has since also been given the designation V1489 Cygni on account of the small semi-regular brightness variations, but is still most commonly referred to as NML Cygni. Its composition began to be revealed with the discovery of OH masers (1612 MHz) in 1968.

Physical characteristics

NML Cygni is an extremely large and luminous cool supergiant with parameters similar to that of another notable but more extreme cool hypergiant star, VY Canis Majoris, and is also known as a heavily mass-losing OH/IR supergiant. It is also a semiregular variable star with a period of either 1,280 or 940 days. It occupies the upper-right hand corner of the Hertzsprung–Russell diagram although most of the properties of the star depend directly on its distance.

A 2006 study, similar to those conducted on VY Canis Majoris, suggests that NML Cygni is a normal red supergiant with consequently much lower luminosity and radius values. A radio angular diameter of 44 mas was given based on the distance, suggesting the optical angular diameter may be around 22 mas.

NML Cygni lies close to the expected position that a  star would evolve to after eight million years.

NML Cygni is evolved and a number of heavy elements and molecules have been detected in its atmosphere, particularly oxygen, hydroxyl, and water. It is surrounded by dusty material and it exhibits a bean-shaped asymmetric nebula that is coincident with the distribution of its H2O vapor masers.

The annual parallax of NML Cygni is measured to be around 0.62 milliarcseconds. From the observations, it is estimated that NML Cygni has two discrete optically thick envelopes of dust and molecules. The optical depth of the inner shell is found to be 1.9, whereas that of the outer one is 0.33. These dust envelopes are formed due to the strong post-main-sequence wind, which has a velocity .

Because of the star's position on the outskirts of the massive Cygnus OB2 association, the detectable effects of NML Cygni's radiation on the surrounding dust and gas are limited to the region away from the central hot stars of the association.

Notes

References 

M-type hypergiants
M-type supergiants
Cygnus (constellation)
Semiregular variable stars
Astronomical objects discovered in 1965
Cygni, V1489
J20462554+4006594